Béla Kiss (c. 1877 – after 4 October 1916) was a Hungarian serial killer. He is thought to have murdered at least 23 young women and one man, and attempted to pickle their bodies in large metal drums that he kept on his property.

Background 

Béla Kiss was born in Izsák, Austria-Hungary to János Kiss and Verona Varga. At a young age, Kiss possibly had an incestuous relationship with his mother.

A tinsmith, Béla Kiss lived in Cinkota (then a town near Budapest, now a neighborhood within the city itself) from 1900 on. He was an amateur astrologer and allegedly fond of occult practices. Kiss was married twice, and had two children, Aranka and Ilonka. In 1912, Kiss hired a housekeeper, Mrs. Jakubec, after his wife had reportedly abandoned him for a lover.

Jakubec noticed that Kiss corresponded with a number of women, typically through advertisements he would place in newspapers offering his services as either a matrimonial agent or a fortune teller, and sometimes brought the women individually to his home. However, his housekeeper had little contact with the women.

Kiss was never on intimate terms with his neighbors, even though he was well-liked. Townsfolk also noticed that Kiss had collected a number of metal drums. When the town police questioned him about the drums, he told them that he filled them with gasoline in order to prepare for rationing in the oncoming war.

When World War I began in 1914, he was conscripted and left his house in Jakubec's care.

Criminal activity 
In July 1916, Budapest police received a call from Kiss' landlord, who had found seven large metal drums. The town constable remembered Kiss' stockpile of gasoline, and he led needy soldiers to them. Upon attempting to open the drums, a suspicious odour was noted. Detective Chief Károly Nagy headed an investigation and opened one of the drums, against the protests of Jakubec. There they discovered the body of a strangled woman. The other drums yielded similarly gruesome content. A search of Kiss' house resulted in a total of 24 bodies.

Nagy informed the military that they should arrest Kiss immediately, if he was still alive; there was also a possibility that he was a prisoner of war. His name, unfortunately, was very common. Nagy also arrested Jakubec and asked the postal service to hold any possible letters to Kiss, in case he
had an accomplice who could warn him. Nagy initially suspected that Jakubec might have had something to do with the murders, especially since Kiss had left her money in his will. Jakubec assured police that she knew absolutely nothing about the murders. She showed them a secret and locked room Kiss had told her never to enter. The room was filled with bookcases and had a desk, which held a number of letters, Kiss' correspondence with 74 women, and a photo album. Many of the books were about poisons or strangulation. From the letters, Nagy discerned several things. The oldest of the letters were from 1903 and it became clear that Kiss was defrauding the women—usually middle-aged—who had been looking for marriage. He had placed ads in the marriage columns of several newspapers and had selected mainly women who had no relatives living nearby and knew no one who would quickly notice their disappearance. He wooed them and convinced them to send him money. Police also found old court records that indicated that two of his victims had initiated court proceedings because he had taken money from them. Both women had disappeared, and the cases had been dismissed.

Each woman who came to the house was strangled. Kiss pickled their corpses in alcohol and sealed them in the airtight metal drums. Police found that the bodies had puncture marks on their necks and that their bodies were drained of blood, which led them to believe that Kiss may have been practicing vampirism.

Escape 
On 4 October 1916, Nagy received a letter that stated that Kiss was recuperating in a Serbian hospital. However, Nagy arrived at the hospital too late; Kiss had fled and left the corpse of another soldier in his bed. Nagy alerted all the Hungarian police, but all the alleged sightings police investigated were false.

Sightings 
On several later occasions, speculation arose that Kiss had perhaps faked his death by exchanging identities with a dead soldier named Mackaree during the war. He was reportedly sighted numerous times in the following years. Various rumors circulated as to his actual fate, including that he had been imprisoned for burglary in Romania or he had died of yellow fever in Turkey. In 1920, a soldier in the French Foreign Legion reported on another legionnaire named Hoffman, the name Kiss had used in some of his letters, who had boasted how good he was at using a garrote and who fit Kiss' description. "Hoffman" deserted before police could reach him.

The last known supposed sighting occurred in New York City in 1932. That year, homicide detective Henry Oswald was certain he had observed Kiss emerging from the New York City Subway at Times Square, Manhattan. There were also rumors that Kiss was living in the city and working as a janitor, although these could not be verified. When the police went to interview the janitor, he had already left.

Kiss' eventual fate and exact number of victims remain unknown.

In popular culture 

The play Thirty-Two by Antonin Artaud was inspired by the case.
The story "Béla Kiss Goes to the Theatre" by David Kuhnlein was inspired by Artaud's play about Kiss' crimes. Another excerpt from Kuhnlein's novella, Béla Kiss, was featured in Apocalypse Confidential's WAR issue. 
The German horror movie Bela Kiss: Prologue (a.k.a. The Kiss of a Killer or Natural Born Killer) by director Lucien Förstner released in 2013 is based on Kiss' biography.
 The novel Hill House by Gopi Kottoor was inspired by the true events in the life of Béla Kiss.
 The song "The Alphabet Serial Song" by Amoree Lovell lists Bela Kiss as the B.
The song "Bela Kiss" by Bloodsucking Zombies from Outer Space is based on the Bela Kiss murders.
The song "Bela Kiss" by Gazpacho is based on the Bela Kiss murders.
The song "Bella Kiss" by John 5 is inspired by the Bela Kiss murders.
The song "Bella's Kiss" by Funke and the Two Tone Baby is inspired by the Bela Kiss murders
The band Bela Kiss, a metal/hardcore band from Long Island, NY, named themselves after the murderer.

See also 
 List of serial killers by country
 List of serial killers by number of victims
 List of fugitives from justice who disappeared
 Elizabeth Báthory
 Vera Renczi

References

Further reading

External links 
 Crime Library article about Béla Kiss

1870s births
Austro-Hungarian military personnel of World War I
Hungarian occultists
Hungarian serial killers
Male serial killers
Tinsmiths
Vampirism (crime)
Violence against women in Europe
Year of death missing